John Martinis (June 4, 1930 – January 29, 2013) was an American politician in the state of Washington. He served in the Washington House of Representatives from 1969 to 1984 for district 38.

References

2013 deaths
1930 births
Democratic Party members of the Washington House of Representatives